Catharylla bijuga is a moth of the family Crambidae described by Théo Léger and Bernard Landry in 2014. It occurs in lowlands of the Guianas (Guyana, Suriname, and French Guiana) and Brazil.

The length of the forewings is 9–10.5 mm for males and 11–15 mm for females. The forewings are snow white, with a yellow-ochreous to brown costal margin, partially disrupted when meeting the transverse lines. The hindwings are snow white, the veins slightly ochreous.

Etymology
The species name refers to the bifid costal arm of the male genitalia and is derived from Latin bijugus (meaning yoked together, double).

References

Argyriini
Moths of South America
Lepidoptera of Brazil
Lepidoptera of French Guiana
Lepidoptera of Guyana
Fauna of Suriname
Moths described in 2014